Splendrillia zanzibarica is a species of sea snail, a marine gastropod mollusk in the family Drilliidae.

Description
The height of the shell attains 19.3 mm, its diameter 8.1 mm.

Distribution
This marine species occurs off Zanzibar.

References

 Sysoev, A. V. "Deep-sea conolidean gastropods collected by the John Murray Expedition, 1933-34." Bulletin of the Natural History Museum Zoology Series 62 (1996): 1–30

External links
  Tucker, J.K. 2004 Catalog of recent and fossil turrids (Mollusca: Gastropoda). Zootaxa 682:1–1295.

zanzibarica
Gastropods described in 1996